Wu Kung-tsao or Wu Gongzao (1902–1983) was a famous Chinese teacher of t'ai chi ch'uan. He taught in Beijing, Shanghai, Changsha and Hong Kong. The second son of Wu Chien-ch'üan, he was the grandson of the first teacher of Wu-style t'ai chi ch'uan, Wu Ch'uan-yü. Wu Kung-tsao was the younger brother of Wu Kung-i and the older brother of Wu Ying-hua. The Wu family were originally of Manchu ancestry.

Biography
As a young man, he studied t'ai chi ch'uan, along with his brother, under the supervision of Yang Shao-hou. There was a tradition in the Chinese martial arts that youngsters be taught by teachers of a generation older than their parents'. Since Wu Ch'uan-yü had died the same year Wu Kung-tsao was born, he and his brother were taught by Yang Shao-hou, who was technically a generation senior to their father. Both Yang Shao-hou and Wu Chien-ch'üan were famous for their "small circle" martial expertise. The motions of t'ai chi ch'uan forms and pushing hands are all based on different sized circles, small circle movements in the forms and applications follow a more compact pathway for different leverage applications than larger circles.

In the 1920s Wu Kung-tsao served first as an infantry officer in the Thirteenth Brigade of the Nationalist army until 1929, then later as a martial art instructor for the Hunan Martial Arts Training Centre as well as an instructor for the famous Ching Wu martial art school. During the 1930s, he wrote a well-known commentary on the classic writings in 40 chapters on t'ai chi ch'uan that his grandfather had inherited from Yang Pan-hou. His commentary (including the original 40 chapters) was published as Wu Chia T'ai Chi Ch'uan (吳家太極拳, Wu family T'ai Chi Ch'uan), also known by English speakers as The Gold Book because of the colour of its cover. In 1937, he established his family's first school in Hong Kong. In addition to his teaching and literary contributions to the art, Wu Kung-tsao became known as a specialist in the nei kung aspect of T'ai Chi training, both for martial purposes and for therapeutic interventions along the lines of traditional Chinese medicine.

Wu Kung-tsao stayed on the mainland after the Chinese Communist takeover in 1949. During and for a short time after the Cultural Revolution of 1964-1978 he was imprisoned by the Red Guards due to his history as a Nationalist military officer, a traditional Confucian scholar and Taoist teacher as well as a hostage to ensure the "good behaviour" of the rest of his family who were at the time living in Shanghai and Hong Kong. He was routinely tortured while a prisoner but was finally released in 1979, when he moved again to Hong Kong.

Wu Kung-tsao's second son Wu Ta-hsin was also known as an expert martial artist and teacher who in his turn was the senior instructor of the Wu family schools internationally from 2001 until 2005.

Generational senior instructors of the Wu family
1st Generation

Wu Ch'uan-yü (Wu Quanyou, 吳全佑, 1834–1902), who learned from Yang Luchan and Yang Pan-hou, was senior instructor of the family from 1870-1902.

2nd generation

His oldest son, Wu Chien-ch'üan (Wu Jianquan, 吳鑑泉, 1870–1942), was senior from 1902-1942.

3rd Generation

His oldest son, Wu Kung-i (Wu Gongyi, 吳公儀, 1900–1970) was senior from 1942-1970.

Wu Kung-i's younger brother, Wu Kung-tsao (Wu Gongzao, 吳公藻, 1903–1983), was senior from 1970-1983.

Wu Kung-i's younger sister, Wu Ying-hua (Wu Yinghua, 吳英華, 1907–1997), was senior from 1983-1997.

4th Generation

Wu Kung-i's daughter, Wu Yen-hsia (Wu Yanxia, 吳雁霞, 1930–2001) was senior from 1997-2001.

Wu Kung-tsao's son, Wu Ta-hsin (Wu Daxin, 吳大新, 1933–2005), was senior from 2001-2005.

5th Generation

The current senior instructor of the Wu family is Wu Ta-k'uei's son Wu Kuang-yu (Wu Guangyu, Eddie Wu, 吳光宇, born 1946).

T'ai chi ch'uan lineage tree with Wu-style focus

References

External links

 International Wu Style Tai Chi Chuan Federation website
 Detroit, Michigan Wu style website

1902 births
1983 deaths
Chinese tai chi practitioners
Manchu martial artists